EasySky is a low-cost airline based in Honduras. Its head office is located in Tegucigalpa, and since 2015, its primary operational base is at Toncontín International Airport in Tegucigalpa.

Destinations

EasySky flies to the following scheduled and charter destinations: 
 Juan Manuel Gálvez International Airport
 Toncontín International Airport
 José Martí International Airport
 Maurice Bishop International Airport
 Hewanorra International Airport
 Cancún International Airport
 Toluca International Airport
 Tocumen International Airport
 Cheddi Jagan International Airport
 Simón Bolívar International Airport
 Arturo Michelena International Airport
 Argyle International Airport

Fleet

Current fleet

As of August 2017 EasySky operates the following aircraft:

Former fleet
The airline previously operated the following aircraft:
 3 further Boeing 737
 2 Bae Jetstream 31

Incidents and accidents
On December 31, 2012, one of EasySky's planes veered off the runway while landing in San Pedro Sula and landed in a ditch. There were no fatalities and only one person was hurt.

EasySky and its parent Global Air were linked to the May 2018 Cubana de Aviación Flight 972 tragedy, in which 112 people died, through the use of a wet lease aircraft.

Legal Action 
In 2018 easyGroup, licensor of the easyJet brand began legal proceedings against EasySky and Colombia-based EasyFly over use of the "easy" prefix.

References

External links
Official website (Offline)
Archived EasySky website - Wayback Machine snapshot taken on 22 March 2018, accessed 16 August 2018

Airlines of Honduras
Low-cost carriers